The National League (NL) is a professional ice hockey league in Switzerland and is the top tier of the Swiss league system. Prior to the 2017–18 season, the league was known as National League A. During the 2018–19 season, the league had an average of 6,949 spectators per game which is the highest among European leagues (ahead of the KHL with 6,397 and the DEL with 6,215). The capital city's club SC Bern has been ranked first of all European clubs for 18 seasons and had an average attendance of 16,290 after the regular season. The ZSC Lions are another club in the top ten of European ice hockey attendance, ranking seventh with 9,694 spectators.

Teams from the NL participate in the IIHF's annual Champions Hockey League (CHL), competing for the European Trophy. Participation is based on the strength of the various leagues in Europe (excluding the European/Asian Kontinental Hockey League). Going into the 2022–23 CHL season, the NL was ranked the No. 2 league in Europe, allowing them to send their top five teams to compete in the CHL.

Season structure
During the regular season, each of the 14 teams play 52 games. The top eight teams after the regular season qualify for the playoffs to determine the Swiss champion in best-of-seven series. The bottom four teams in the standings play a relegation tournament, called playouts, in which each team retains their regular season points and play an additional six matches. Following those matches, the two bottom ranked teams will play each other in a best-of-seven series, with the loser then playing the winner of the Swiss League playoffs in a best-of-seven series for a spot in the successive NL season.

Current teams

Import players
The current gentlemen's agreement allows teams to dress a maximum of six non-Swiss players for each game. There is no official rule as it would be against Swiss laws to limit foreign workers in a given enterprise. This agreement is not directly related to Swiss citizenship as players with different nationalities but with Swiss player-licenses are considered Swiss players, thus they do not count as import players. Current examples of this scenario are Deniss Smirnovs and Eliot Berthon with Genève-Servette HC and Floran Douay and Ronalds Ķēniņš with Lausanne HC. They all play with Swiss player-licenses as they have spent a good majority of their childhoods playing hockey with junior teams in Switzerland yet they do not possess Swiss citizenships. Such players would not be able to play in the NL if it was not for their Swiss player-licenses as they would not be considered good enough to use an import player spot on any team. Those spots are usually reserved for players who have had good NHL careers or players with great stats and performances in the AHL, SHL, KHL or Liiga.

The subject of import players has been and still is a huge subject of debates among team owners and GMs. Some of them wish to allow more import players per game in order to reduce the salaries of star Swiss players and the others want to keep that limit lower to allow more Swiss players to play on special units and have top roles on their teams.

Media coverage
NL games are only available in Switzerland and MySports is the league's official broadcaster, airing all regular season and playoffs games. MySports pays CHF 35 million per year to broadcast NL games and selected SL games. Games are available with German, French and Italian commentaries.

Starting with the 2022/23 season, one game will be broadcast live and for free every week on local TVs on Sunday night with a puck drop set to 8pm. 

The SRG SSR airs regular season games highlights after each round and two selected games per playoff night in all three languages. Additionally, talk-shows are broadcast live on all 3 channels after each game night, featuring former Swiss players like Gil Montandon, Marco Bührer or Mark Streit.

Past champions

2022 - EV Zug 4-3 ZSC Lions
2021 - EV Zug 3-0 Genève-Servette HC
2020 – no winner
2019 – SC Bern 4-1 EV Zug
2018 – ZSC Lions 4-3 HC Lugano
2017 – SC Bern 4-2 EV Zug
2016 – SC Bern 4-1 HC Lugano
2015 – HC Davos 4-1 ZSC Lions
2014 – ZSC Lions 4-0 Kloten Flyers
2013 – SC Bern 4-2 Fribourg-Gottéron
2012 – ZSC Lions 4-3 SC Bern
2011 – HC Davos 4-2 Kloten Flyers
2010 – SC Bern 4-3 Genève-Servette HC
2009 – HC Davos 4-3 Kloten Flyers
2008 – ZSC Lions 4-2 Genève-Servette HC
2007 – HC Davos 4-3 SC Bern
2006 – HC Lugano 4-1 HC Davos
2005 – HC Davos 4-1 ZSC Lions
2004 – SC Bern 3-2 HC Lugano
2003 – HC Lugano 4-2 HC Davos
2002 – HC Davos 4-0 ZSC Lions
2001 – ZSC Lions 4-3 HC Lugano
2000 – ZSC Lions 4-2 HC Lugano
1999 – HC Lugano 4-1 HC Ambrì-Piotta
1998 – EV Zug 4-2 HC Davos
1997 – SC Bern 3-1 EV Zug
1996 – EHC Kloten 3-0 SC Bern
1995 – EHC Kloten 3-1 EV Zug
1994 – EHC Kloten 3-1 HC Fribourg-Gottéron
1993 – EHC Kloten 3-0 HC Fribourg-Gottéron
1992 – SC Bern 3-2 HC Fribourg-Gottéron
1991 – SC Bern 3-1 HC Lugano
1990 – HC Lugano 3-1 SC Bern
1989 – SC Bern 3-2 HC Lugano
1988 – HC Lugano 3-0 EHC Kloten
1987 – HC Lugano 3-0 EHC Kloten
1986 – HC Lugano 2-0 HC Davos
1985 – HC Davos 
1984 – HC Davos
1983 – EHC Biel
1982 – EHC Arosa
1981 – EHC Biel
1980 – EHC Arosa
1979 – SC Bern
1978 – EHC Biel
1977 – SC Bern
1976 – SC Langnau
1975 – SC Bern
1974 – SC Bern
1973 – HC La Chaux-de-Fonds
1972 – HC La Chaux-de-Fonds
1971 – HC La Chaux-de-Fonds
1970 – HC La Chaux-de-Fonds
1969 – HC La Chaux-de-Fonds
1968 – HC La Chaux-de-Fonds
1967 – EHC Kloten
1966 – Grasshopper-Club Zürich
1965 – SC Bern
1964 – HC Villars
1963 – HC Villars
1962 – EHC Visp
1961 – ZSC Lions
1960 – HC Davos
1959 – SC Bern
1958 – HC Davos
1957 – EHC Arosa
1956 – EHC Arosa
1955 – EHC Arosa
1954 – EHC Arosa
1953 – EHC Arosa
1952 – EHC Arosa
1951 – EHC Arosa
1950 – HC Davos
1949 – ZSC Lions
1948 – HC Davos
1947 – HC Davos
1946 – HC Davos
1945 – HC Davos
1944 – HC Davos
1943 – HC Davos
1942 – HC Davos
1941 – HC Davos
1940 – no winner
1939 – HC Davos
1938 – HC Davos

Swiss National Championship Serie A (1909–1937)

 1909: HC Bellerive Vevey
 1910: HC La Villa Lausanne
 1911: Club des patineurs de Lausanne
 1912: HC Les Avants
 1913: HC Les Avants
 1914: not played
 1915: not played
 1916: HC Bern
 1917: HC Bern
 1918: HC Bern
 1919: HC Bellerive Vevey
 1920: HC Bellerive Vevey
 1921: HC Rosey-Gstaad
 1922: EHC St. Moritz
 1923: EHC St. Moritz
 1924: HC Château-d'Œx
 1925: HC Rosey-Gstaad
 1926: HC Davos
 1927: HC Davos
 1928: EHC St. Moritz
 1929: HC Davos
 1930: HC Davos
 1931: HC Davos
 1932: HC Davos
 1933: HC Davos
 1934: HC Davos
 1935: HC Davos
 1936: Zürcher SC
 1937: HC Davos

Swiss International Championship Serie A (1916–1933)

 1916: Akademischer EHC Zürich
 1917: HC Les Avants
 1918: HC Bellerive Vevey
 1919: HC Rosey-Gstaad
 1920: HC Rosey-Gstaad
 1921: HC Rosey-Gstaad
 1922: HC Château-d'Œx
 1923: EHC St. Moritz
 1924: HC Château-d'Œx
 1925: HC Rosey-Gstaad
 1926: no winner
 1927: HC Davos
 1928: HC Rosey-Gstaad
 1929: HC Davos
 1930: HC Davos
 1931: HC Davos
 1932: HC Davos
 1933: Grasshopper-Club Zürich

Titles by club

See also
Swiss League
PostFinance Top Scorer

References

External links
  
 Puck.ch Results of Swiss Ice Hockey – in English, French, German and Italian
 An Analysis Of The Swiss NLA
 All-time standings 1909–2008

 
Professional ice hockey leagues in Switzerland
Top tier ice hockey leagues in Europe